MJQ may refer to:
 Manhattan Jazz Quintet
 Modern Jazz Quartet
 Jackson Municipal Airport (Minnesota) (IATA: MJQ), an airport in the United States